Przybysławice may refer to the following places:
Przybysławice, Gmina Skała in Lesser Poland Voivodeship (south Poland)
Przybysławice, Gmina Zielonki in Lesser Poland Voivodeship (south Poland)
Przybysławice, Lublin Voivodeship (east Poland)
Przybysławice, Gmina Gołcza in Lesser Poland Voivodeship (south Poland)
Przybysławice, Gmina Kozłów in Lesser Poland Voivodeship (south Poland)
Przybysławice, Proszowice County in Lesser Poland Voivodeship (south Poland)
Przybysławice, Opatów County in Świętokrzyskie Voivodeship (south-central Poland)
Przybysławice, Sandomierz County in Świętokrzyskie Voivodeship (south-central Poland)
Przybysławice, Tarnów County in Lesser Poland Voivodeship (south Poland)
Przybysławice, Greater Poland Voivodeship (west-central Poland)